Phrygia was a daughter of Cecrops, from whom the country of Phrygia was believed to have derived its name.

Phrygia is also an epithet for Cybele, as the goddess who was worshipped above all others in Phrygia, and as a surname of Athena on account of the Palladium which was brought from Hellespontine Phrygia.

Phrygia was also a feminine personal name attested in ancient Athens, since ca. 500 BC

Phrygia is the name of Spartacus’ wife in Aram Kachaturian’s 1954 ballet Spartacus.

Notes

References

Attic mythology
Greek mythology of Anatolia
Cybele
Epithets of Athena